The London Borough of Hillingdon is responsible for 239 parks and open spaces within its boundaries. Since much of the area is within the Green Belt, there are large areas of land properly called open space. They range in size from the Colne Valley corridor to the smallest gardens and playing fields.

Barra Hall Park
Bishop's Wood Country Park
Cranford Park
Denham Lock Wood
Eastcote House Gardens
Frays Farm Meadows
Gutteridge Wood
Hayes Park
Hillingdon Court Park
Ickenham Marsh
Lake Farm Country Park
Mid Colne Valley
Minet Country Park
Norman Leddy Memorial Gardens
 No Man's Land
Old Park Wood
Ruislip Woods (inc. Bayhurst Wood Country Park, Copse Wood, Mad Bess Wood)
Pinkwell Park
Stockley Country Park
Hillingdon Parks Patrol Service
 Uxbridge Common
Uxbridge Cricket Club Ground

External links
LB Hillingdon Green Spaces
LB Hillingdon Parks and open spaces